Kim and Reggie Harris are a folk music duo based in upstate New York.

They have released five CDs on the Appleseed Recordings label, and one on the Folk Era label.

References

External links
Official Website

American folk musical groups
American musical duos
Folk music duos
Married couples